Lalling is a municipality in the Lower Bavarian district of Deggendorf in Germany. It is a nationally recognized resort town.

Geography
Lalling is located along the Danube in the south of the Bavarian Forest, specifically in what is called the Lallinger angle.

History
Lalling and its community were first mentioned in a letter of protection from Pope Eugene III in 1148. From the early 13th Century until 1803 the Niederaltaich Abbey was its largest landlord. Lalling was considered part of the lands held by the Electorate of Bavaria. In the course of administrative reform in Bavaria, it became municipality in 1818.

Attractions
 the Tithe barn at Niederalteich Abbey

References

Deggendorf (district)